The Beretta Model 1915 or Beretta M1915 is a semi-automatic pistol manufactured by Beretta, designed by Tullio Marengoni who was the chief engineer in the company, to replace the Glisenti Model 1910 which had a complex and weak firing mechanism. It is the first semi-automatic pistol which was manufactured by the company, and issued as a service pistol in Royal Italian Army during World War I. The total production of the Beretta M1915 is estimated about 15,670 during 1915-1918, and about 56,000 of Beretta M1915/1917. Some of the pistols were also used in World War II until 1945. The design of the pistol is similar to modern Beretta pistols such as Beretta M1923, Beretta M1934, Beretta M1935, Beretta M1951, Beretta 70, Beretta 92, Beretta Cheetah, and Beretta M9.

History
The Glisenti Model 1910 used a bottlenecked 7.65 mm round which was similar to the 7.65×21mm Parabellum. Later, having the Italian Army judged the 7.65 round to be too light for military use, and having launched a competition for 9mm handguns instead, the Metallurgica Bresciana Tampini, owner of the design, adapted the Glisenti pistol to fire a 9mm round, obtained enlarging the original one (eliminating the bottleneck) without changing the load. Therefore, although being the cartridge dimensionally identical to the 9mm Luger (that was obtained in the same way from the 7.65×21mm Parabellum, but increasing the load) the 9mm Glisenti cartridge has a load that is about 1/4 lighter than the original military load of the 9mm Luger. When Italy entered World War I, the need for more military pistols increased dramatically. The chief designer Tullio Marengoni completed his design of a simple blowback action pistol that could fire the same 9mm Glisenti cartridge, was patented by the Pietro Beretta Arms Factory on June 29, 1915, and was immediately adopted by the Royal Army, just over a month involved in the Great War. It replaced the previous ordnances, the revolvers Chamelot Delvigne 1874 and Bodeo Model 1889 and above all the automatic Glisenti Model 1910 and Brixia Mod. 1913, not fully satisfactory. A .32 ACP version, the Beretta M1917, was also produced and was adopted by the Italian Royal Navy. Finally, it was replaced as an ordnance by the Beretta M1934.

Features
The barrel is cylindrical, with a cylindrical front end on which the viewfinder is fixed, while underneath the rear end protrudes the peg joining the stem ; the core has 6 right-handed lines with a 270 mm pitch.

The cart also acts as a shutter; on the back it has the expulsion window, in front of which it is completely open to accommodate the cane. Behind the ejection window, on the other hand, it has the extractor lever and finally the rear sight, with dovetail joint. Inside the trolley the striker is placed with its spring, while on the lower surface there is the sleeve in which the spring guide rod of the return spring is inserted; at the back there is the recess for the movement of the dog.

The front part of the stem houses the recovery spring with its rod; it engages the lower sleeve of the carriage at the front, while at the rear it contrasts with the safety pin. The latter also acts as a retainer for the barrel, as it is inserted into a recess of the vertical peg below the breech. The straight handle, inclined only 9° with respect to the barrel, with knurled grips in walnut, is a single piece with the stem and the trigger bridge and contains a magazine, a trigger chain, the dog's spring and the holder's retention; the latter is placed on the base of the handle, posteriorly. The left hand grip has a notch for the corrugator holder. The magazine, made of sheet steel, has a capacity of 7 rounds bullets and is monofilament. Laterally it has large fenestrations or large circular holes. The sole that closes the bottom protrudes slightly on the front to facilitate extraction.

There are two safety devices: one is inserted on the back of the shaft: it consists of a piece that, turning the lever with knurled end button so as to uncover the S engraved on the stem, goes into a joint in the dog's head, blocking it. The other one is on the left side; externally it consists of two arms pivoted on the peg that blocks the barrel and the return spring; the rear arm ends with a knurled button, the front arm with a tooth. By lowering the rear button (uncovering the S engraved on the stem), the pin blocks the trigger and unlocks the barrel (which can be disassembled), while the tooth of the front arm intercepts one of the two incisions on the lower edge of the carriage.
The M1915 is unusual in the fact that it used 2 manual safeties. One is a slide stop safety on the left side of the frame. The other is a small lever on the rear of the frame. If either safety is set, the pistol will not fire.

Variants

M1915/17
The gun is smaller and lighter than the M1915. The straight handle, inclined only 9 ° with respect to the barrel, has vertically scored grip panels instead of knurled ones. The trigger guard is round instead of ovular. The grip safety has been removed. The frame mounted safety one on the left side is present as well as acting as a safe blocking the trigger, it also works as a dismounting pin and hold open lever . Also missing are the shock absorber spring and the ejector , which is replaced in its function by the striker. The magazine contains 8 rounds bullet instead of 7. The war production ended in 1921, while the civil one continued for a long time. Finally, in the 1940s a batch of 1,500 pistols was sent to the Finnish Army.

M1915/19

The improved version of M1915/17, which chambers 7.65mm Browning cartridge same as the M1915/17 pistol. The round post barrel mount where the barrel was lifted straight up out of the frame was replaced with a T slot mount. This required a larger opening in the top of the slide so the double opening of the M1915 was changed to a single longer one. The slide now looked like the characteristic open-top Beretta style.

Users
 - 1,500 M1915/17s brought from Italy in 1940.
 (used by the Italian Royal Army, Italian Royal Air Force,  Italian Royal Navy and  Italian Royal Police.)

References

External links

Beretta firearms
Semi-automatic pistols of Italy
9mm Glisenti firearms
World War I Italian infantry weapons
Beretta pistols
Weapons and ammunition introduced in 1915